John Curtis Brackenbury (born January 31, 1952, in Kapuskasing, Ontario) is a Canadian retired professional ice hockey forward who played 141 games in the National Hockey League and 257 games in the World Hockey Association. Prior to the merger of the upstart WHA and the NHL, the WHA played European teams and Brackenbury was an MVP in at least one game.  He played for the Chicago Cougars, Minnesota Fighting Saints, Quebec Nordiques, Edmonton Oilers, and St. Louis Blues.

In 1986 Brackenbury was recruited to Canada's America's Cup Challenge, the Canada II campaign. He trained with the team in Victoria, BC, San Francisco and Santa Cruz, California, and was chosen as part of the final crew to go to Australia to race for the cup.

Career statistics

Regular season and playoffs

External links

1952 births
Living people
Canadian ice hockey forwards
Chicago Cougars players
Edmonton Oilers players
Hampton Gulls (SHL) players
Ice hockey people from Ontario
Minnesota Fighting Saints players
People from Kapuskasing
Quebec Nordiques players
Quebec Nordiques (WHA) players
Salt Lake Golden Eagles (CHL) players
St. Louis Blues players
Undrafted National Hockey League players
Wichita Wind players
Canadian expatriate ice hockey players in the United States